Cultural backwardness was a term used by Soviet politicians and ethnographers. There were at one point officially 97 "culturally backward" nationalities in the Soviet Union. Members of a "culturally backward" nationality were eligible for preferential treatment in university admissions. In 1934 the Central Executive Committee declared that the term should no longer be used, however preferential treatment for certain minorities and the promotion of local nationals in the party structure through korenizatsiya continued for several more years.

Characteristics
The People's Commissariat for Education listed five official characteristics of culturally backward nationalities:
 An extremely low level of literacy
 An extremely low percentage of children in school
 Absence of a written script connected to a literary language
 Existence of "social vestiges" (oppression of women, racial hostility, nomadism, religious fanaticism)
 An extremely low level of national cadres

List of culturally backward nationalities
In 1932 the People's Commissariat for Education published an official list of "culturally backward" nationalities:

 Abkhaz
 Adyghe
 Adjarians
 Aleut
 Assyrian
 Azerbaijanis
 Avars
 Baksan (a tribe of Balkars)
 Balkars
 Bashkirs
 Besermyan
 Bulgarians
 Buryats
 Chechen
 Cherkes (Adyghe)
 Chinese
 Chud
 Chukchi
 Chuvans
 Chuvash
 Dargins
 Dolgans
 Dungans
 Eskimo
 Giliaks (Nivkhs)
 Golds (Nanai)
 Greeks
 Ingush
 Izhorians
 Kabardin
 Kaitaks (now classified as Dargins)
 Kalmyks
 Kamchadals

 Karachays
 Karagasy (Tofalars)
 Kara-nogais
 Karakalpaks
 Karelians
 Kazakhs
 Kets
 Khakas
 Komi-Permyaks
 Komi-Zyrians
 Koryaks
 Koreans
 Krymchaks
 Kumandins
 Kumyks
 Kurds
 Kurd-ezid (Yazidis)
 Kyrgyz
 Laks
 Lamuts (Evens)
 Lezgins
 Lopars (Sami)
 Manegry (Evenks)
 Mari
 Moldovans
 Mongols
 Mordvins
 Nagaybak
 Negidals
 Nenets
 Nogais
 Oirats

 Oroch
 Orochen (Orochon, a tribal division of Evenks)
 Ossetians
 Ostyak (Khanty)
 Persians
 Roma (Gypsies)
 Rutuls
 Samagir (Nanai)
 Shapsugs
 Shors
 Soyot
 Tabasarans
 Tajiks
 Taranchis
 Tats
 Tatars (outside of the Tatar ASSR)
 Tavgi (Nganasans)
 Teptyars (now classified as Bashkirs)
 Teleuts
 Tungus (Evenks)
 Turkmen
 Tuvans
 Udege
 Udmurts
 Ulch
 Uyghurs
 Uzbeks
 Vepsians
 Voguls (Mansi)
 Votes
 Yakuts
 Yukaghir

See also
Affirmative action

Notes

References
 
 

Affirmative action
Ethnic groups in the Soviet Union
Soviet phraseology